Frederick Savage (3 March 1828 – 27 April 1897) was an English engineer and inventor.

Savage is most notable as a chief innovator in the field of steam powered fairground machinery and later as mayor of Kings Lynn, Norfolk. He was the inventor of a system for running fairground carousels using a horizontally-mounted steam engine at its centre. His carousels were exported all over the world. By 1870, he was manufacturing carousels with velocipedes (an early type of bicycle) and he soon began experimenting with other possibilities, including a roundabout with boats that would pitch and roll on cranks with a circular motion, a ride he called 'Sea-on-Land'.

Savage applied a similar innovation to the more traditional mount of the horse; he installed gears and offset cranks on the platform carousels, thus giving the animals their well-known up-and-down motion as they travelled around the center pole – the "galloping horse". The platform served as a position guide for the bottom of the pole and as a place for people to walk or other stationary animals or chariots to be placed. He called this ride the 'Platform Gallopers'. He also developed the 'platform-slide' which allowed the mounts to swing out concentrically as the carousel built up speed.

Biography 
Savage was born in Hevingham, Norfolk, during the reign of George IV, a period in which agriculture in the UK was at a low ebb. His early years provided him with a patchy education and he remained only semi-literate throughout his life. When his father, William Savage, was found guilty of poaching (a serious matter at that time), resulting in a sentence of 14 years penal servitude in Tasmania, Frederick’s work as a hurdle-maker on a local country estate proved inadequate to feed the family. In search of a better way of life, Savage entered the service of Thomas Cooper, Whitesmith and Machine Maker.

Savage married Susannah Bloyce in 1850. He also sought employment with Charles Willett of Kings Lynn, credited as a brazier, tinplate worker, ironmonger, wholesale and retail dealer, whitesmith and bell hanger. In 1851, Savage move to King’s Lynn on the west Norfolk coast with his wife.

Shortly after this, Willet retired, allowing Savage to begin his own operations. His new company produced engines to power agricultural machinery, as well as engines for carousels and merry-go-rounds. In 1872, Savage moved the business to St Nicholas Ironworks in King’s Lynn.

Savage was appointed a Justice of the Peace (JP) and was appointed Mayor of Kings Lynn from 1889 to 1890. A monument to him in his mayoral robes was unveiled on 27 May 1892 in King's Lynn, and is found at the junction of London Road and Guanock Place. The statue received national attention when British artist Banksy added a faux tongue and ice cream to the monument, as part of the A Great British Spraycation series of artworks. These articles were later removed by King's Lynn and West Norfolk Borough Council. Savage died in 1897.

References 

English mechanical engineers
1828 births
1897 deaths